Finn Kristian Marthinsen (born 17 January 1946 in Brunlanes) is a Norwegian politician for the Christian Democratic Party.

He was elected to the Norwegian Parliament from Buskerud in 1997, and was re-elected on one occasion.

Marthinsen was a member of Drammen municipality council from 1999 to 2003.

References

1946 births
Living people
Christian Democratic Party (Norway) politicians
Members of the Storting
People from Larvik
Buskerud politicians
21st-century Norwegian politicians
20th-century Norwegian politicians